Varaminak (also Romanized as Varāmīnaḵ) is a village in Saidabad Rural District, in the Central District of Shahriar County, Tehran Province, Iran. At the 2006 census, its population was 23, in 11 families.

References 

Populated places in Shahriar County